The 2020 World Qualification Event for the World Curling Championships was held from January 13 to 18 at the Kisakallio Sports Institute in Lohja, Finland. The competition consisted of sixteen teams divided evenly into men's and women's divisions. The top two teams in the men's division qualified to compete at the 2020 World Men's Championship and similarly the top two teams in the women's division qualified to compete at the 2020 World Women's Championship. China and Russia qualified in the men's division and South Korea and Italy qualified in the women's division.

Men

Qualification
Eight men's teams will qualify to participate in the 2020 World Qualification Event, through the following methods:

Teams

Round-robin standings
Final round-robin standings

Round-robin results
All draws are listed in Eastern European Time (UTC+02:00).

Draw 1
Monday, January 13, 19:00

Draw 2
Tuesday, January 14, 14:00

Draw 3
Wednesday, January 15, 09:00

Draw 4
Wednesday, January 15, 19:00

Draw 5
Thursday, January 16, 14:00

Draw 6
Friday, January 17, 09:00

Draw 7
Friday, January 17, 19:00

Playoffs

1 vs. 2
Saturday, January 18, 09:00

Winner qualifies for 2020 World Men's Curling Championship.

Loser drops to second place game.

Second place game
Saturday, January 18, 14:00

Winner qualifies for 2020 World Men's Curling Championship.

Women

Qualification
Eight women's teams will qualify to participate in the 2020 World Qualification Event, through the following methods:

Notes
Crossed-out teams qualified for this event on merit, but later withdrew and were replaced by the next highest ranking team.

Teams

Round-robin standings
Final round-robin standings

Round-robin results
All draws are listed in Eastern European Time (UTC+02:00).

Draw 1
Monday, January 13, 15:00

Draw 2
Tuesday, January 14, 09:00

Draw 3
Tuesday, January 14, 19:00

Draw 4
Wednesday, January 15, 14:00

Draw 5
Thursday, January 16, 09:00

Draw 6
Thursday, January 16, 19:00

Draw 7
Friday, January 17, 14:00

Playoffs

1 vs. 2
Saturday, January 18, 09:00

Winner qualifies for 2020 World Women's Curling Championship.

Loser drops to second place game.

Second place game
Saturday, January 18, 14:00

Winner qualifies for 2020 World Women's Curling Championship.

References 

World Qualification Event
International curling competitions hosted by Finland
World Qualification Event
World Qualification Event
Lohja